Nelson Edwin Matthews (April 14, 1852 – October 13, 1917) was an American politician who served one term a U.S. Representative from Ohio from 1915 until his death in 1917.

Biography 
Born in Ottawa, Ohio, Matthews attended the public schools.
He engaged in banking, mercantile, and manufacturing pursuits in Ottawa.
He served as delegate to the Republican National Convention in 1908.
He served as delegate to the fourth State constitutional convention in 1912.

Congress 
Matthews was elected as a Republican to the Sixty-fourth Congress (March 4, 1915 – March 3, 1917).
He was an unsuccessful candidate for reelection in 1916 to the Sixty-fifth Congress.
He died in Maumee, Ohio, on October 13, 1917.
He was interred in Fort Meigs Cemetery, Perrysburg, Ohio.

Sources

1852 births
1917 deaths
People from Ottawa, Ohio
Ohio Constitutional Convention (1912)
19th-century American politicians
Republican Party members of the United States House of Representatives from Ohio